Nessma El Jadida (translation: New Breeze), formerly known as Nessma TV (translation: "Breeze TV") and Nessma Rouge (translation: Red Breeze) was a commercial TV channel based in Tunisia, targeting Tunisia and the Maghreb countries. It was 25% formerly owned by the Italian company Mediaset, controlled by Silvio Berlusconi. All programmes broadcast on this channel had subtitles in French or Maghrebi Arabic. It broadcast such programs as the Maghrebi version of Who Wants to Be a Millionaire?, called Man sa yarbah al malyoon.

The TV channel was launched on 16 March 2007, by Nabil and Ghazi Karoui, in partnership with Berlusconi and Tarak Ben Ammar. It was created as a subsidiary of Karoui & Karoui World Group.

On 27 October 2021, the channel was ordered to shut down by Tunisia's broadcasting regulator, which said it was operating without a license. The channel's studios were also raided by Tunisian state security forces, and may have been politically motivated, as Nessma owner Nabil Karoui (the runner-up in the 2019 Tunisian presidential election) who has since been recently and frequently jailed is a rival of President Kais Saied. The seizure was also sudden as the network had been unlicensed for years, but no action had previously been taken.

The channel was granted a temporary license by HAICA to reoperate on 8 March 2022 after a negotiation between the representatives of the channel and the president of HAICA on 15 February 2022.

The channel was officially relaunched on 11 March 2022. The channel is now owned by the new managing director Zied Riba under his company Maghreb Broadcast. The channel's name was also changed to Nessma El Jadida or New Nessma (translation: "New Breeze").   The channel became available on the Iraqi satellite ShababSat on DMN.

Programming

Shows 
 Bissiyassa
 Braquage
 Couzinetna Hakka
 Dhayf Al Ousboua
 Envoyé spécial Maghreb
 Imine Issar
 Jek El Mersoul
 Les guignols du Maghreb
 Memnoua Al Rjel
 Moustawdaa Nessma
 Ness El CAN
 Ness El Hand
 Ness Hollywood
 Ness Nessma
 Ness Sport
 NetMag
 Non Solo Moda
 PlayR
 Star Academy Maghreb

Soap operas 
 Aşk-ı Memnu
 Bab al-Hara
 Cello
 Kurtlar Vadisi
 Muhteşem Yüzyıl
 Nsibti Laaziza

Brand identity

References

External links 
Official website 

Arabic-language television stations
Mediaset television channels
Television stations in Tunisia
Television stations in Morocco
Television stations in Algeria
Television channels and stations established in 2007